Google TV may refer to:

 Google TV (interface), an updated interface of Android TV launched in 2020
 Google TV (service), a video-on-demand service formerly known as Google Play Movies & TV
 Google TV (operating system), a discontinued operating system for smart TVs

See also 
 Android TV
 Chromecast with Google TV
 Fiber TV
 YouTube TV